High-altitude flatus expulsion (HAFE) is a gastrointestinal syndrome which involves the spontaneous passage of increased quantities of rectal gases at high altitudes. First described by Joseph Hamel in c. 1820 and occasionally described afterward. A landmark study of this phenomenon was published in 1981 by Paul Auerbach and York Miller.

The feeling of fullness or need to expel brought on by this differential in atmospheric pressure has been verified by studies involving military pilots subjected to pressure changes simulating flight.

See also
 High-altitude pulmonary edema
 High-altitude cerebral edema
 Flatulence

References

Mountaineering and health
Flatulence
Gastrointestinal tract disorders